The Provost of Imperial College London is the second highest academic official at Imperial College London. The post is currently held by Ian Walmsley, who has held the post since 2018, following on from the original title holder James Stirling.

List of Provosts

 2013 James Stirling
 2018 Ian Walmsley

References

External links
Imperial College London website

People associated with Imperial College London
Imperial College London, Provosts
Imperial College London